The GCC Champions League, is an annually organized football league tournament for club of the Arabian peninsula.

The 2014 edition is the 29th edition and is officially known as the Pharmaton 29th GCC Club Cup Championship due to sponsorship reasons.

The competition kicked off on 3 February 2014 making it change to being played in one calendar year which was the usual format until changed for the last edition.

Groups
Four groups of three teams.

Top two from each group qualify for the one legged quarter finals with group winners hosting the matches.

Group stage

Group A

Group B

Group C

Group D

Quarter-finals

Group winners host a one legged Quarter Final match.

Semi-finals

The draw for the semi finals were conducted on 24 April 2014.

First leg

Second leg

Saham advanced on penalties after a 4–4 aggregate draw.

Al-Nasr won 3–2 on aggregate.

Final

References

External links
 2014 GCC Champions League at Goalzz.com

2014
2014 in Asian football